Mithapukur is an upazila of Rangpur District in the division of Rangpur, Bangladesh. The upazila is situated in the middle of Rangpur, surrounded by Rangpur Sadar to the north, Pirganj to the south, Badarganj and Phulbari to the west and Pirgachha and Sundarganj to the east. Mithapukur is famous for being the birthplace of Begum Rokeya Sakhawat Hossain and its sweet mango Harivanga.

Etymology
Mithapukur is the largest upazila in Rangpur zila in respect of both area and population. It came into existence in 1885 as a thana and was upgraded to upazila in 1983. Nothing is definitely known about the origin of the upazila name. It is said that Mir Jumla II, the Subahdar of Bengal, came there by the order of the Mughal Emperor Aurangzeb in order to invade Koch Bihar. He set up a camp near the current Mithapukur Degree College during the period of his military expedition in Bengal. His forces faced an acute problem of water for which a pond was dug near the camp. The water of the pond was so sweet that Mir Jumla named the place "Mithapukur" (Mitha means Sweet and Pukur means Pond). Some believe that Shah Ismail Ghazi ordered to dig the pond. It is believed that the pond consisted of five separate ponds. But in course of time, they mixed into a single pond.

The name Mithapukur also appears in the James Rennell's Dury Wall Map of Bihar and Bengal, India (as Mettypukre) and N. Hindostan Map (as Mettypokra) and John Bartholomew's Map of Provinces of the Lower Ganges (as Mitapokhar).

Geography
It has total area 515.62 km2. Mithapukur possesses a vast fertile land. The Jamuneshwari, Akhira, and Ghaghot are the major river flow through Mithapukur. The river, Akhira has divided Mithapukur landscape into two parts. The western part of Mithapukur is locally known as "Khiyari" (probably derived from the word "khoyeri" meaning reddish brown) due to its reddish-brown soil and the eastern part is known as "Poly" (= sediment) area. The eastern part is the largest. Mithapukur is inside the Varendra area. Many "Shalbon" (a forest whose main tree is the Shala tree) can be found in the western part of the Upazila which are thought to be the parts of a huge Varendra forest. Most of them are now reserved by the government. The Gopalpur Forest is the main landmark of Terrace soil area.

Demographics
As of the 2011 Bangladesh census, Mithapukur has a population of 5,08,133 where males constitute 2,52,325 and females constitute 2,55,807 of the population with annual population growth rate of 1.21%. The total number of household of Mithapukur is 1,35,073. Mithapukur has an average literacy rate of 46% (7+ years) compared to the national average of 51.8% literate and 2nd highest literacy rate among the upazila Rangpur district followed by Rangpur Sadar.

Mithapukur Upazila has a very diverse population with minority groups including Buddhists, Christians and tribes such as Santhal who have lived in the district from the beginning of settlement in this area.

Economy

Agriculture is demographically the broadest economic sector and plays a significant role in the overall socio-economic fabric of Mithapukur. Mithapukur is the largest producer of mangoes, vegetables and potatoes in the district. Mithapukur is the birthplace of the sweet mango Harivanga, famous for its different taste.

Points of interest
Mithapukur Upazila has many historical and attractive places. Begum Rokeya Memorial in Pairaband is the birthplace of Begum Rokeya Sakhawat Hossain (1880–1932), an eminent educationist and a pioneer of women's liberation. Mithapukur's most popular tourist attractions are the Mithapukur Pond (excavated during the Mughal period), Benubon Buddhist Vihara-Mithapukur, the Mughal era three domed Mithapukur Mosque, Tanka jami Mosque at Latibpur, and Gopalpur forest and Eco park.

Administration
Mithapukur Upazila is divided into Badarganj Municipality and 17 union parishads: Balarhat, Balua Masimpur, Barabala, Bara Hazratpur, Bhangni, Chengmari, Durgapur, Emadpur, Gopalpur, Kafrikhal, Khoragachh, Latibpur, Milanpur, Mirzapur, Moyenpur, Pairaband, and Ranipukur. The union parishads are subdivided into 310 mauzas and 315 villages.

Relating to Education

Educational Institutions 
(a) Primary Schools: 268 (B) Lower secondary schools: 20 (C) Secondary schools: 85 (D) Madrasas: 52 (E) Technical schools and colleges: 5 (F) Kinder Garden: 35 (G) Ibtedayi Madrasa: 50 (H) BRAC Primary School: 39 (I) Colleges: 16

Education 

There are many educational institutions in Mithapukur, including a few degree colleges.

Primary Education Center 

 Paglarhat Mangushree Government Primary School
 Akabpur Government Primary School

High schools 

 Arifpur Junior School
 Adarsha High School Mithapukur
 Akhirahat Collegiat High School
 Al-farooque Institute (high School)
 Bairati Junior Girls School Adarhat Adarsha High School
 Balar Hat Model Junior School
 Balarhat High School
 Balua Junior Girls High School
 Bander Para Junior School
 Betgara Junior School
 Bhagabatipur High School
 Bhagobatipur Uttarpara High School
 Bhktipur High School
 Birahimpur Adarsha High School
 Bujruk Tajpur Abarsha High School
 Burail Adorsha Junior School Bairati Bl High School
 Buzruk Mohodipur Girls High School
 Buzruk S. A. High School
 Chadpara Nurani Jr School
 Chalk Bazar Jonior School
 Chuhar High School
 Dhap Bagashory Junior School
 Durgamoti Junior Girls School
 Durgapur High School
 Emadpur Bilateral High School
 Fakirhat Public High School
 Fariudpur High School
 Formuder Para Junior School
 Girai High School
 Gopal Pur High School
 Gopalpur Hamidia High School
 Hulashuganj Bl High School
 Ideal Publik School
 Imadpur Popschim Para High School
 Jaigir High School & College
 Jalal Ganj High School
 Jamal Pur Farida Begum High School
 Jankipur High School
 Jarullapur Girls High School
 Jarullapur High School
 Kashimpur Junior School
 Keshobpur High School
 Khoragach M.l High School
 Khordashan Tipur Junior School
 Kumarganj High School
 Mahiapur Junior High School
 Matherpur Junior School
 Miarhat Ideal Junior High School
 Mirzapur Adarsha School And College
 Mirzapur Girl's High School
 Mirzapur High School
 Mithapukur Girls High School
 Mithapukur High School
 Molong Junior Girl's High School
 Moulovi Ganj High School
 Moyenpur High School
 Moyenpur Kadamtala Bl High School
 Murad Darpa Narayan Pur Junior School
 Muradpur Jr High School
 Nanakar Girl's High School
 Nankar Bilateral High School
 Natibpur B. L .high School
 Nidhirampur Junior Girls School
 Nishchintapur Samiunnessa Girls High School
 Noorpur Girl's High School
 Ovirampur Junior High School
 Padagonj High School & College
 Padmapukur High School
 Paglarhat Monjusree High School
 Paikan High School
 Pairabond B R M Girl's High School
 Pirarhat Junior High School
 Radha Krishnopur High School
 Rahamotpur Junior Girls School
 Ramnather Para Junior High School
 Ranipukur High School And College
 Rasul Pur Junior School
 Ratia High School
 Rupshi High School
 Sahid Zia Saran Girls High School
 Saifur's English School
 Salipur High School
 Samina Khatun Girls High School
 Saran B/l High School
 Satani Raghabandropur High School
 Sathibari Girls High School
 Shah Abul Kashem High School
 Shal Mara Bl High School
 Shaltirhat Bl.high School
 Sherpur High School
 Sherudanga Adarsha Jr.girls High School
 Sherudanga School And College
 Shital Gari High School
 Shthibari M.l High School
 Shukurer Hat High School
 Talimgonj Junior High School
 Tanka Girls Bi Lateral High School
 Thakur Bari Girls School

Madrasas 

 Alipur Islamia Dakhil Madrasha
 Bairati Rahmania Dakhil Madrasha
 Balarhat Hamidia Alim Madrasha
 Bara Hazaratpur Dakhil Madrasah
 Batason Islamia Dakhil Madrasha
 Bhaktipur Mahbubia Dakhil Madrasah
 Bhangni Ahmadia Fazil Madrasa
 Buzrug Sontoshpur K.fazil Madrasa
 Chandoni Chandpur Dakhil Madrasha
 Charan Adarsah Girls Dakhil Madrasah
 Chatra Ahmadia Dhakhil Madrasah
 Chharan Bahrul Ulum Alim Madrasah
 Dhap Shampur K.s.d Madrasha
 Emadpur F. U. Fazil Madrasha
 Enayetpur Islamia Dakhil Madrasha
 Faridpur Abdullah Dakhil Madrasah
 Faridpur Mollapara Aminia Dakhil Madrasha
 Guttibari Islamia Fazil Madrasha
 Hulashu Ganj Rashidia Girls Dakhil Madrasha
 Jadabpur Islamia Dakhil Madrasha
 Jafarpur Dakhil Madrasha
 Jaigir Hat Fakhrul Ulum Senior Madrasha
 Jointipur Pirosthan Dakhil Madrasha
 Jorgas Moinpur Dakhil Madrasha
 Kagzipara Ashrafia Dakhil Madrasah
 Keshobpur Nezamia Dakhil Madrasah
 Khordakomarpur Islamia Girls Dakhil Madrasha
 Kumorganj Rahmania Dakhil Madrasha
 Lashkarpur Ashkia Dakhil Madrasah
 Madarpur E.a. Dakhil Madrasha
 Mazgram Darul Huda Dakhil Madrasha
 Milonpur Modinatul Ulum Dakhil Madrasha
 Mirzapur Quaderia Senior Fazil Madrasa
 Mithapukur Dakhil Madrasah
 Molong Shihab Sairaj Dakhil Madrasha
 Muradpur Razzakia Alim Madrasha
 Mushapur Dakhil Madrasah
 Nankor Dakhil Madrasha
 Nayanpur Dakhil Madrasah
 Nidhirampur Girls Dakhil Madrasa
 Pacharhat Dakhil Madrasah
 Paglar Hat Dakhil Madrasha
 Pairaband S. Dakhil Madrasha
 Ramrayer Para Islamia Dakhil Madrasha
 Rokaniganj Ahya Ul-ulum Dakhil Madrasah
 Rupshi Chetanaganj Rahmania Dakhil Madrasah
 Shadullapur Baharul Ulum Dakhil Madrasha
 Shalthi Para Pirsthan Dakhil Madrasah
 Shathi Bari Islamia Senior (alim) Madrasa
 Sherudanga Darul Ulum Dakhil Madrasha
 Sukurerhat Islamia Bilateral Alim Madrasha
 Tarfshadi Khairul Ulum Dakhil Madrasah

Colleges of Mithapukur 
 Payraband Government Begum Rokeya Memorial Degree College,
 Jaigir High School and College,
 Mithapukur College,
 Shatibari College,
 Ranipukur High School and College,
 Padaganj School and College
 Akhirahat College,
 Shukurerhat College 
 Scatter College
 Bairati College
 Mirzapur Bachir Uddin College 
 Balarhat College 
 Balarhat Adarsh College 
 Henna Memorial Women's College 
 Serudanga School and College. 
 Mirzapur Adarsh High School and College.

Transport
Mithapukur is well connected to Dhaka, Rangpur, Bogra by National highway. Mithapukur can be reached by the 304 km long National highway(N5) from Dhaka. The highway also provides a link to the neighbouring divisional town Rangpur by 18 km from Upazila Sadar. Highway buses run from kallanpur, Dhaka to Rangpur and it takes about six to seven hours.

Notable residents
 Begum Rokeya Sakhawat Hossain, writer, educationist, and social activist, was born in Pairaband in 1880.
H.N.Ashequr Rahman Bangladesh Awami League politician and Incumbent Member of Parliament
 Dr.Rashid Askari, Bengali-English writer, fictionist, columnist, translator, professor of English and the 12th vice-chancellor of Islamic University, Bangladesh

See also
Upazilas of Bangladesh
Districts of Bangladesh
Divisions of Bangladesh

References

Upazilas of Rangpur District